Anastasiya Kisse (born ) is a Bulgarian and Ukrainian individual rhythmic gymnast. She represented her nation at international competitions. She competed at world championships, including at the 2011 World Rhythmic Gymnastics Championships.

She holds both Bulgarian and Ukrainian citizenships.

Early life 
Anastasiya was born on July 27, 1995 in Odessa, Ukraine. She was born to the Ukrainian politician of Bulgarian origin Anton Kisse and his wife Galina Kisse.

Education 
Kisse has lived and studied in Ukraine, Russia, Bulgaria, Azerbaijan and The United Kingdom. She has graduated secondary school in London, England after living there for 3 years. She has studied Law in Bulgaria for 1 year and currently studies Finance in UNWE in Sofia, Bulgaria. She also has a Bachelor's and master's degree from the K. D. Ushynsky South Ukrainian National Pedagogical University in Odessa.

She speaks several languages including English, Bulgarian, Ukrainian and Russian.

Career 
Kisse starts training at the age of 3 in Ukraine. Later she moves and continues training in Bulgaria. She has also lived and trained in Azerbaijan and with the national team of Russia in Novogorsk in Moscow. She was a member of the Junior Olympic team of rhythmic gymstastics of Bulgaria. Kisse has taken part and won medals in the Junior Olympic Games and many more.

However, Kisse is forced to retire from sports after her last trauma in the back, which doesn't allow her to continue training. She puts an end to her career in 2014.

She is currently working in the Russian embassy in Sofia, as well as a trainer to an Estonian gymnast.

Personal life 
Anastasiya's father is the current president of the Association of Bulgarians of Ukraine and the deputy of the Verkhovna Rada of Ukraine Anton Kisse. Anastasiya has two older brothers, Gennadiy and Maksim. Gennadiy has graduated Law in the Taras Shevchenko National University of Kyiv and currently works as an assistant to the Prosecutor General of Ukraine, while Maksim has graduated the Odessa National Economics University in Ukraine. Anastasiya holds both Ukrainian and Bulgarian citizenship.

Anastasiya is close friends with the Russian 2016 Olympic All-around silver  medalist Yana Kudryavtseva and the  2016 Olympic All-around Champion and gold medalist Margarita Mamun.

References

External links
http://g-ritmica.blogspot.com/2010/09/la-maestria-de-anastasiya-kisse.html
 https://database.fig-gymnastics.com/public/gymnasts/biography/9847/true?backUrl=%2Fpublic%2Fresults%2Fdisplay%2F1862%3FidAgeCategory%3D6%26idCategory%3D77%23anchor_2268

1995 births
Living people
Sportspeople from Odesa
Ukrainian emigrants to Bulgaria
Bulgarian rhythmic gymnasts
Place of birth missing (living people)
Gymnasts at the 2010 Summer Youth Olympics
University of National and World Economy alumni